Djabugay (or Djabuganjdji; see below for other names) is an endangered Australian Aboriginal language spoken by the Djabugay people with 46 native speakers at the 2016 census. The Djabugay language region includes Far North Queensland, particularly around the Kuranda Range and Barron River catchment, and the landscape within the local government boundaries of the Cairns Regional Council.

Classification
Though sometimes placed in a separate Yidinyic branch of Pama–Nyungan, Bowern (2011) retains Djabugay in its traditional place within the Paman languages.

Dialects
The following languages are confirmed dialects of Djabugay by the AUSTLANG database maintained by Australian Institute of Aboriginal and Torres Strait Islander Studies. Djabugay is used both as a language name and a dialect name. Additional names for these languages and/or dialects have been listed after their names but terms do overlap and the lists are not exhaustive.

 Y106: Djabugay / Tjapukai – Barron River dialect, Binggu, Bulum-Bulum, Buluwai, Check-Cull, Chewlie, Dja:bugay, Djabugai, Djabuganjdji, Djabungandji, Dyaabugay, Dyabugandyi, Dyabugay, Hileman, Irukandjai, Kikonjunkulu, Kodgotto, Koko-Tjumbundji, Koko njunkulu, Koko nyungalo, Koko Tjumbundji, Kokonjunkulu, Kokonyungalo, Ngarlkadjie, Njakali, Nyakali, Orlow, Tapelcay, Tcabogai tjanji, Tja:pukanja, Tjabakai-Thandji, Tjabogai tjandji, Tjabogai tjanji, Tjabogaijanji, Tjabogaitjandji, Tjankir, Tjankun, Tjapukandji, Tjapukanja, Tjapunkandji, Tjunbundji, Toabogai tjani, Tuffelcey
 Y110: Bulway – Buluwan dyi, Buluwandji, Buluwandyi, Bulwandji, Bulwandyi
 Y111: Yirrgay – Chumchum, Dingal, Djabungandji, Dungara, Dungarah, Illagona, Irakanji, Irukandji, Tingaree, Tingeree, Umbay, Walpoll, Wongulli, Yerkanji, Yettkie, Yirgandji, Yirgay, Yirkandji, Yirkanji
 Y160: Guluy – Dyaabugay
 Y162: Nyagali – Njagali

Phonology

Consonants

Vowels

Vocabulary
Some words from the Djabugay language, as spelt and written by Djabugay authors include:

 Bulurru: elsewhere known as Dreaming, the source of life.
 Gurrabana: where people and everything in Djabugay society and life is divided between wet and dry, this is the wet season side.
 Gurraminya: where people and everything in Djabugay society and life is divided between wet and dry, this is the dry season side.
 Djirri-nyurra: hello
 Guyu: fish
 Gan gula: kangaroo
 Bulmba: home
 Bana: rain
 Wuru: river
 Bungan: sun

See also
Yidiny language

References

Further reading 

 Aboriginal and Torres Strait Islander Language Wordlists: Djabugay Everyday Words, published by State Library of Queensland under CC-BY license, accessed 17 May 2022.

Yidinyic languages
Paman languages
Endangered indigenous Australian languages in Queensland
Severely endangered languages